In 1953 Billboard magazine published three charts covering the best-performing country music songs in the United States: Most Played in Juke Boxes, National Best Sellers, and Most Played By Jockeys.  The three charts had been published since 1944, 1948 and 1949 respectively.  All three charts are considered part of the lineage of the multimetric Hot Country Songs chart, which was first published in 1958.

In the issue of Billboard dated January 3, Hank Williams was at number one on both the best sellers and jockeys charts with "Jambalaya (On the Bayou)", retaining a position it had held on both listings since the final issue of 1952.  Williams thus held the top spot when he died in the early hours of January 1, 1953.  Following his death, Williams achieved considerable chart success in the first half of 1953, particularly on the best sellers chart.  He returned to number one on that listing later in January with the final single released in his lifetime, "I'll Never Get Out of This World Alive", and went on to have two further posthumous number ones with "Take These Chains from My Heart" and "Kaw-Liga", the latter of which spent 13 consecutive weeks at number one, the year's longest unbroken run atop any of the three charts.  His total of 19 weeks at number one on the retail listing (including one when he tied for the top spot) was the most achieved by any act, and he achieved the same feat on both the juke box and jockeys charts, with 10 and 15 weeks at number one respectively.   "Your Cheatin' Heart", which fell short of the number one position on the best sellers chart, topped both the other listings, meaning that five songs by Williams reached number one on one or more of the charts in 1953.  Regarded as one of the most influential musicians in country music history, Williams was among the inaugural class of entrants to the Country Music Hall of Fame in 1961.

Seven acts achieved their first number ones in 1953: the Carlisles, Goldie Hill, Jim Reeves, the duo of Jean Shepard and Ferlin Husky, the Davis Sisters, Mitchell Torok, and Hank Locklin.  In addition to having his first number one as a performer with "Caribbean", Torok also wrote the song "Mexican Joe", which gave Jim Reeves his first chart-topper.  Hill's chart-topper "I Let the Stars Get In My Eyes" was only the second country number one by a solo female artist; it was written as an answer song to "Don't Let the Stars Get in Your Eyes" by Slim Willet, which had begun the year at number one on the juke box chart.  "I Forgot More Than You'll Ever Know" would prove to be the only charting song for the Davis Sisters, who were not actually related.  Two months before it topped the charts one half of the duo, Betty Jack Davis, had been killed in an automobile accident.  Surviving member Skeeter Davis would go on to have a long solo career, scoring top 20 country successes well into the 1970s and achieving some pop success, but she would never achieve a solo number one.  At the end of the year "I Forgot More Than You'll Ever Know" was at number one on the juke box chart, Webb Pierce topped the best sellers chart with "There Stands the Glass" and Hank Locklin held the top spot on the jockeys chart with "Let Me Be the One".

Chart history

a.  Two songs tied for number one on the best sellers chart.
b.  Two songs tied for number one on the jockeys chart.

See also
 1953 in country music
 List of artists who reached number one on the U.S. country chart

References

1953
Country
1953 record charts